Claus Wunderlich (born 9 January 1922) was a German sailor. He competed in the Star event at the 1952 Summer Olympics.

References

External links
 

1922 births
Possibly living people
German male sailors (sport)
Olympic sailors of Germany
Sailors at the 1952 Summer Olympics – Star
Place of birth missing (living people)